Flammeovirga agarivorans is a Gram-negative, aerobic and motile bacterium from the genus of Flammeovirga which has been isolated from seawater from the Luhuitou fringing reef in China.

References

Cytophagia
Bacteria described in 2020